India Untouched: Stories of a People Apart is a 2007 documentary by Indian filmmaker Stalin K. The film reveals the discrimination and atrocities against dalits and practice of Untouchability rooted in different parts of India. Stalin's interview and clips of the film were featured in Episode 10: Dignity for All of Satyamev Jayate TV series on the issue of Untouchability.

Awards
The documentary won numerous awards:
 Silver Dhow, Second-best Documentary, Zanzibar International Film Festival, Tanzania.
 Golden Conch, Best Documentary, Mumbai International Film Festival.
 Best Film of the Festival, 2008 Mumbai International Film Festival.
 Best Documentary, Mahindra IAAC Film Festival, New York.
 Best Film, One Billion Eyes Film Festival, Chennai, India.

References

External links
 Official website
 
 India Untouched on You Tube

Indian documentary films
Films about the caste system in India
Films directed by Stalin K
Dalit communities
Dalit history
Films about social issues in India